Las Minas (Spanish, 'The Mines') may refer to:

Populated places
 Las Minas District, Panama
Las Minas, Herrera
 Las Minas, Veracruz, Mexico

Natural features
 Cerro Las Minas, the highest mountain in Honduras
 Las Minas Creek, a river in Jalisco, Mexico
 Río de la Mina (Coamo, Puerto Rico), a river in Puerto Rico
 Río de la Mina (Río Grande, Puerto Rico), a river in Puerto Rico

Archaeological sites
 Cerro de las Minas, a Mixtec site in Oaxaca, Mexico